Andréa Guida Berlanga Henriques (born January 5, 1980) is a female water polo player from Brazil, who won the bronze medal with the Brazil women's national water polo team at the 2003 Pan American Games. She also competed at the 2007 Pan American Games, finishing in fourth place.

References
  Profile

1980 births
Living people
Brazilian female water polo players
Water polo players from São Paulo
Pan American Games bronze medalists for Brazil
Pan American Games medalists in water polo
Water polo players at the 2003 Pan American Games
Medalists at the 2003 Pan American Games
21st-century Brazilian women